The discography of American singer-songwriter Bobby Vinton consists of 38 studio albums, 67 compilation albums, two video albums, three live albums, and 88 singles.

Studio albums
1961: Dancing at the Hop
1961: Bobby Vinton Plays for His Li'l Darlin's
1962: Roses Are Red (US #5)
1962: Bobby Vinton Sings the Big Ones (US #137)
1963: The Greatest Hits of the Golden Groups
1963: Blue on Blue (reissued as Blue Velvet after the success of the hit of the same name) (US #10)
1964: There! I've Said It Again (US #8)
1964: Tell Me Why (US #31)
1964: A Very Merry Christmas (US #13)
1964: Mr. Lonely (US #18)
1965: Bobby Vinton Sings for Lonely Nights (US #116)
1965: Drive-In Movie Time
1966: Bobby Vinton Sings Satin Pillows and Careless (US #110)
1966: Country Boy
1967: Bobby Vinton Sings the Newest Hits
1967: Please Love Me Forever (US #41)
1968: Take Good Care of My Baby (US #164)
1968: I Love How You Love Me (US #21)
1969: Vinton (US #69)
1970: My Elusive Dreams (US #90)
1970: Sounds of Love (on sax)
1972: Ev'ry Day of My Life (US #72)
1972: Sealed With a Kiss (US #77)
1974: Melodies of Love (US #16)
1974: If That's All I Can
1974: With Love (US #109)
1975: Heart of Hearts (US #108)
1975: The Bobby Vinton Show (US #161)
1976: Serenades of Love
1976: Party Music ~~ 20 Hits
1977: The Name Is Love (US #183)
1979: 100 Memories
1980: Encore
1987: Santa Must Be Polish
1988: Bobby Vinton
1989: Timeless
1990: Great Songs of Christmas
1992: As Time Goes By (with George Burns)

Live albums
1966: Live at the Copa

Compilations
1964: Bobby Vinton's Greatest Hits (US #12)
1966: More of Bobby's Greatest Hits
1970: Bobby Vinton's Greatest Hits of Love (US #138)
1970: Vinton Sings Vinton
1971: The Love Album (US #204)
1971: To Each His Own
1972: Bobby Vinton's All-Time Greatest Hits (US #119)
1973: The Bobby Vinton Treasury （Columbia House 6LP set）
1973: Bobby Vinton Gold Disk (Epic Japan)
1973: Bobby Vinton: Grandes Exitos
1974: The Many Moods of Bobby Vinton (Columbia House 2LP set)
1974: The Many Moods of Bobby Vinton: Bobby Vinton...in Love (Columbia House)
1974: Hurt: Best of Bobby Vinton (Holland)
1975: Best of Bobby Vinton, 2 (Holland)
1975: Bobby Vinton Sings the Golden Decade of Love (US #154)
1976: Best of Bobby Vinton
1976: K-Tel Presents Bobby Vinton - 20 Greatest Hits
1976: Bobby Vinton's Greatest Hits/Greatest Hits of Love
1978: Bobby Vinton
1978: Autumn Memories
1979: Spring Sensations
1979: Summer Serenades
1979: The Million Selling Records of Bobby Vinton (Candlelites)
1980: My Song
1981: Polka Album (Tapestry Records)
1981: Bobby Vinton's Greatest Hits
1982: Bobby Vinton Songbook(Holland)
1982: The Very Best of Bobby Vinton  (Holland)
1983: His Heart-Touching Magic (Suffolk Marketing)
1985: The Best of Bobby Vinton (Heartland music)
1985: Ballads of Love (Heartland music)
1990: Bobby Vinton's Greatest Hits
1990: Blue Velvet (UK #67)
1991: Mr. Lonely: His Greatest Songs Today (Curb Records)
1991: Greatest Polka Hits of All Time (Curb Records)
1991: 16 Most Requested Songs (US #199; charted in 1996)
1991: Roses Are Red My Love(Beautiful Music Company)2LP set
1992: Sealed With a Kiss (Epic Germany)
1993: The Essence of Bobby Vinton
1994: Bobby Vinton; His Greatest Hits and Finest Performances (Reader's Digest)3CD set
1994: My Greatest Hits (K-tel)
1995: The Ultimate Bobby Vinton (Belgium)
1995: Kissin' Christmas: The Bobby Vinton Christmas Album
1995: Roses Are Red
1997: 36 All time Greatest hits (Timeless Music)3 CD set
1998: Bobby Vinton Sings Blue Velvet: His Greatest Hits (Europe)
2000: Blue on Blue (with Andy Williams)2 CD set
2001: Bobby Vinton (U.K. Curb Records)
2001: The Very Best of Bobby Vinton (TV music 2CD set)
2001: Mr. Lonely/Country Boy
2001: Sealed With a Kiss/With Love
2001: Tell Me Why/Sings For Lonely Nights
2002: Ev'ry Day of My Life/Satin Pillows and Careless
2002: Take Good Care of My Baby/I Love How You Love Me
2002: Please Love Me Forever/My Elusive Dreams
2002: Live at the Copa/Drive-In Movie Time
2002: Greatest Hits
2002: 20 All-Time Greatest Hits
2002: The Legend 
2002: Melodies of love 
2003: Ultimate collection (Columbia, Australia)2CD set
2003: Million Dollar Polkas (Beautiful Music Company)
2003: Love Songs
2003: All-Time Greatest Hits(Varese Sarabande)
2004: The Best of Bobby Vinton
2002: Essential Bobby Vinton (Poland)
2005: The Great Bobby Vinton (Austaralia)3CD set
2005: Collections(Epic , Canada) 
2006: Because of You: The Love Songs Collection(Varese Sarabande)
2008: Melodies of Love / Heart of Hearts
2014: Roses are red (U.K. Jasmin)
2015: A Very Merry Christmas: The Complete Christmas Collection
2016: Bobby Vinton Forever (Holland)
2021: Early years (U.K. Acrobat)

Related albums
1966: Cool 'n Clear includes "Are You Lonesome Tonight?"
1966: The Twelve Greatest Hits San Remo Festival, 1966 includes "Io Non Posso Crederti" 
1972: A Tribute to Burt Bacharach includes "Blue on Blue" (Alternate take)
1975: The Wonderful World of Christmas includes "Silent Night"
2006: Polka in Paradise, Jimmy Sturr and his Orchestra. Includes guest appearance by Bobby Vinton

Special 12-inch singles
1988: "Sealed with a Kiss" (dance version) (5:49) (instrumental) (3:46)/"Sealed with a Kiss" (radio version) (3:45) "When I Was Seventeen" (extended version) (6:12)

Singles

Originally recorded in the late 50s, this demo recording was released by Diamond Records to compete with Vinton's then-big hit single "Roses are Red (My Love)".  The hit version was not leased to Epic for subsequent LPs, so the song had to be rerecorded for Epic.

Recordings in other languages
German
"Re-Re-Regen fallt" (Rain Rain Go Away)/"Mondscheinallee" (1962) Columbia c22269
"Re-Re-Regen fallt" (Rain Rain Go Away)/"Rosen sind Rot" (Roses are Red) (1962) Columbia c22270
Italian
"Io sono solo" (Mr. Lonely)/"Esse Come stanco" (L-O-N-E-L-Y) (1965) Epic 5-9900
"Io non posso crederti"/"Satin Pillows" (1965) Epic 5-9909
"Io sento d'amarti" (I Love How You Love Me)/"Solo" (1968) Epic 5-9976
"Io ti daro di piu" (1965) Epic 9010 in Portugal EP
Spanish
"Te amo como tu me amas" (I Love How You Love Me)/ "A medio camino del paraiso" (1969) CBS 22.054 (Argentine)
"Di por que" (Tell Me Why)/"Mr. Lonely" (1965) Epic EP.9024

Video releases
Bobby Vinton Live at the Sands Hotel (1984)
Bobby Vinton Live; Songs from My Heart (2002)

References

External links
Japanese fan site
 

Discographies of American artists
Pop music discographies